Chlodomer, also spelled Clodomir or Clodomer (c. 495 - 524) was the second of the four sons of Clovis I, King of the Franks. On the death of his father, in 511, he divided the kingdom of the Franks with his three brothers: Theuderic I, Childebert I, and Chlothar I. Although Theuderic, the eldest, had a better claim, Chlodomer divided half of the kingdom with his two other brothers. This was the kingdom of Orléans,  This kingdom included, most notably, the bishoprics of Tours, Poitiers and Orléans. Chlodomer married Guntheuc, with whom he had three sons: Theodebald, Gunthar, and Clodoald.

In 523–24, possibly at the instigation of his mother Clotilde, who was eager to avenge her nephew who had been assassinated by Sigismund of Burgundy, Chlodomer joined with his brothers in an expedition against the Burgundians. After capturing Sigismund, Chlodomer returned to Orléans. However, Sigismund's brother Gondomar returned triumphantly to Burgundy at the head of the troops sent by his ally, the Ostrogothic king Theodoric the Great. There, he massacred the garrison the Franks had left behind.

Although victorious, Chlodomer had Sigismund and his sons Gisald and Gondebaud assassinated on 1 May 524. He then led a second expedition against the Burgundians. He was killed on this expedition, in the spring or summer of the same year, at the Battle of Vézeronce. His three sons were entrusted to his mother until his widow married Chlothar I. Chlothar, however, had Chlodomer's children killed, although Clodoald managed to escape. Better known as Saint Cloud, he later became abbot of Nogent, having given up his hair, the symbol of the Frankish royalty, rather than giving up his life.

Further reading

 Bachrach, Bernard S. (1972). Merovingian Military Organization, 481–751. Minneapolis: University of Minnesota Press, .
 Geary, Patrick J. (1988). Before France and Germany: The Creation and Transformation of the Merovingian World. Oxford: Oxford University Press, .
 James, Edward (1991). The Franks. London: Blackwell, .
 Oman, Charles (1914). The Dark Ages, 476–918. London: Rivingtons.
 Wallace-Hadrill, J. M. (1962). The Long-Haired Kings, and Other Studies in Frankish History. London: Methuen.
 Wood, Ian N. (1994). The Merovingian Kingdoms, 450–751. London: Longman, .

Merovingian kings
Monarchs killed in action
Frankish warriors
495 births
524 deaths
6th-century Frankish kings